The 1936 Långforssjöloppet was a Grand Prix motor race held on 9 February 1936. This race was part of the 1936 Grand Prix season as a non-championship race. The race was won by Swedish driver Per-Viktor Widengren in his Alfa Romeo 8C 2300.

Results

References

Langforssjoloppet
Auto races in Sweden